Albert Edward Lyons (20 May 1920 – November 1996) was an English professional football full back who played in the Football League for Bury, Millwall, Crewe Alexandra and Rochdale. After his retirement as a player, Lyons served Brentford in a number of backroom roles for over 30 years.

Playing career 
A full back, Lyons began his career in wartime football with Stockport County and after the war, he played in the Football League for Bury, Millwall, Crewe Alexandra and Rochdale. He ended his career in non-league football with Southern League clubs Dartford and Gravesend & Northfleet and won the league title with the latter club in the 1957–58 season.

Physiotherapy and coaching career 
After retiring from football, Lyons became assistant trainer at Brentford. He also helped Ted Gaskell with the running of the club's short-lived 'A' team in the late 1950s and early 1960s. Lyons progressed to become the club physiotherapist in the 1970s and took caretaker charge for one match in September 1976 after the departure of John Docherty. Lyons was awarded a testimonial for his service in May 1984 and at age 63, he played the final 15 minutes of the match against Chelsea. He earned £8,000 from the match (equivalent to £ in ), was given a gold watch and was presented with a Canon League Loyalty Award by Brentford chairman Martin Lange. In September 1990, he came out of retirement to serve as a physiotherapist for the officials at an England international match at Wembley Stadium.

Personal life 
After leaving league football, Lyons settled in Ealing and purchased a newsagents, which he ran with his wife Iris. Lyons suffered from health problems in later life, including bladder cancer, a stroke and having a triple heart bypass operation. As of August 1996, he was living in Bracknell.

Honours 
Gravesend & Northfleet
 Southern League: 1957–58

Individual

 Canon League Loyalty Award

Career statistics

References

English footballers
English Football League players
Association football fullbacks
Bury F.C. players
Millwall F.C. players
Crewe Alexandra F.C. players
Rochdale A.F.C. players
Dartford F.C. players
Ebbsfleet United F.C. players
Southern Football League players
Stockport County F.C. players
1996 deaths
1920 births
Footballers from Rochdale
Brentford F.C. managers
English football managers